The 2015–16 Eastern Michigan Eagles women's basketball team represented Eastern Michigan University during the 2015–16 NCAA Division I women's basketball season. The Eagles, led by fourth year head coach Tory Verdi, played their home games at the Convocation Center, as members of the West Division of the Mid-American Conference. They finished the season 22–12, 10–8 in MAC play to finish in fourth place in the West Division. They advance to the semifinals of the MAC women's tournament where they lost to Central Michigan. They were invited to the WNIT where they defeated Saint Mary's in the first round before losing to TCU in the second round.

On April 9, it was announced that Tory Verdi has resigned from Eastern Michigan and accepted a coaching job at UMass. He finished at Eastern Michigan with a 4 year record of 72–61.

Roster

Schedule
Source: 

|-
!colspan=9 style="background:#006633; color:#FFFFFF;"| Exhibition

|-
!colspan=9 style="background:#006633; color:#FFFFFF;"| Non-conference regular season

|-
!colspan=9 style="background:#006633; color:#FFFFFF;"| MAC regular season

|-
!colspan=9 style="background:#006633; color:#FFFFFF;"| MAC Women's Tournament

|-
!colspan=9 style="background:#006633; color:#FFFFFF;"| WNIT

References
2015–16 Eastern Michigan Media Guide

See also
 2015–16 Eastern Michigan Eagles men's basketball team

Eastern Michigan Eagles women's basketball seasons
Eastern Michigan
Eastern Michigan Eagles women's basketball
Eastern Michigan Eagles women's basketball
2016 Women's National Invitation Tournament participants